Navana Group is a Bangladeshi industrial conglomerate.

History 
Navana Group under the leadership of Shafiul Islam Kamal as chairman emerged into a separate physical entity from Islam Group after the death of its Chairman Jahurul Islam (entrepreneur) which was then the largest business group in Bangladesh. Navana Group comprises a number of companies, has diversified its activities in various areas like product and project marketing, construction and real estate business, international trading, distributions and production of various items and already attained significance in the business arena of Bangladesh.

On 9 September 2009, Bangladesh Securities and Exchange Commission began an investigation into the trades of Navana CNG, a subsidiary of Navana Group.

In 2018, Navana Group sought to reschedule their outstanding loans which stood at 52.03 billion BDT from 30 different banks. The government approved the request in 2020 and provided 5 billion BDT in additional working capital for the group to operate. In April 2021, Azizur Rahman was appointed CEO of Navana Group.

List of companies

The companies of Navana Group are listed below:

Navana Limited is the only agent of toyota in Bangladesh.
Navana Automobiles Limited markets Mahindra and Toyota vehicles in Bangladesh.
NAVANA Batteries Limited.
Navana Real Estate Ltd.
Navana Construction Ltd.
Navana Textiles Ltd.
Navana Interlinks Ltd.
Biponon Limited.
Navana Distributions Ltd.
Navana Electronics Ltd.
Navana Taxi Cab Co. Ltd.
Navana Renewable Energy Ltd.
Navana Logistics Limited
Navana Petroleum Limited
NAVANA ENGINEERING LTD. 
Navana CNG Limited, a sister concern of Navana Group, is the leading CNG service provider of Bangladesh.
NAVANA LPG LIMITED
NAVANA WELDING ELECTRODE LIMITED
Navana Furniture Limited
Navana Foods Limited is the franchise holder of Gloria Jean's Coffees.
Navana Engineering.

Aftab Automobiles Ltd

Aftab Automobiles Ltd, a sister concern of Navana Group mainly a vehicle assembling and small parts manufacturing company. The company has been marketing Toyota & HINO vehicles for Bangladesh market since 1982, recently launched HINO -Mini bus.

See also
 List of companies of Bangladesh

References

Conglomerate companies of Bangladesh
Real estate companies of Bangladesh